Fernando Seoane Antelo (born 25 March 1983) is a Spanish former professional footballer who played as a defensive midfielder.

He achieved Segunda División figures of 426 games and seven goals over 12 seasons, spending one decade with Lugo.

Club career
Born in Santiago de Compostela, Galicia, Seoane started playing with hometown's SD Compostela, remaining two years with the club. In 2004 he joined Deportivo Alavés' reserves, spending two further seasons with them in the Segunda División B.

Subsequently, Seoane continued playing in the third tier, representing Burgos CF, Écija Balompié and CD Lugo. In the 2010–11 campaign, aged 27, he made his Segunda División debut with Catalonia's Gimnàstic de Tarragona, only missing four league matches (37 starts, 3,178 minutes) as the team narrowly avoided relegation.

Seoane returned to Lugo in July 2012, on a three-year contract. He scored his first goal as a professional on 1 September 2013, in a 4–2 home win against Real Jaén. During his spell at the Estadio Anxo Carro he was an essential midfield unit for several coaches, and on 19 October 2017 the 34-year-old agreed to an extension until 2020.

On 23 May 2022, Lugo announced the departure of 39-year-old Seoane at the end of the season, after ten years of service.

References

External links

1983 births
Living people
Spanish footballers
Footballers from Santiago de Compostela
Association football midfielders
Segunda División players
Segunda División B players
Tercera División players
SD Compostela footballers
Deportivo Alavés B players
Burgos CF footballers
Écija Balompié players
CD Lugo players
Gimnàstic de Tarragona footballers